A samurai is a member of the Japanese warrior caste.

Samurai may also refer to:

Film and television 
 Samurai (2002 film), a 2002 Tamil-language film
 Le Samouraï, a 1967 French film also known as The Samurai
 The Samurai (TV series), a Japanese historical fiction TV series of the 1960s
 Samurai Trilogy, a film trilogy starring Toshirō Mifune as Miyamoto Musashi
 Power Rangers Samurai, a series in the Power Rangers franchise
 Samurai (1978), a TV film produced by Universal Television for ABC
 "Samurai", an episode of Power Rangers: SPD

Games 
 Samurai, a wargame by Avalon Hill
 Samurai (board game), a German-style board game
 Samurai (Videopac game), a 1979 videogame for the Magnavox Odyssey
 Samurai, the Indian name of the Nintendo Entertainment System video game console
 Samurai Shodown,  name of a fighting game series by SNK Playmore
 Samurai (Dungeons & Dragons), a character class in the roleplaying game
 SAMURAI, a fictional rock band in the Cyberpunk universe, performed by Refused

Literature 
 Samurai!, an autobiographical book by Martin Caidin, based on the life and career of Saburō Sakai
 The Samurai (novel), a 1980 novel by Shusaku Endo

Music 
 Samurai (Die Apokalyptischen Reiter album), a heavy metal album released 2004
 Samurai (Matti Nykänen album), an album by Matti Nykänen, released 1993
 "Samurai" (song), a 1985 song by Michael Cretu
 "Samurai", song by Dschinghis Khan from Dschinghis Khan (album)
 Samurai, a 2021 mixtape by Beny Jr and el Guincho

Sports 
 "Samurai", the nickname of the Japan national Australian rules football team
 "Samurai Blue", the nickname of the Japan national football team

Other 
 Samurai (beverage), an energy drink in the Philippines and Vietnam
 Samurai (ride), a ride at Thorpe Park and Lagoon Amusement Park
 Samurai bond, a Japanese Yen-denominated bond issued by a foreign entity
 Suzuki Samurai, a small SUV
 SAMURAI, a 2008–2011 European Union surveillance research program

See also